This list of churches in Ringsted Municipality lists church buildings in Ringsted Municipality, Denmark.

List

See also
 Listed buildings in Ringsted Municipality
 List of churches in Sorø Municipality

References

External links

 Nordens kirker: Sydøstsjælland

 
Ringsted